Dichomeris versicolorella is a moth in the family Gelechiidae. It was described by Francis Walker in 1864. It is found in Amazonas, Brazil.

Adults are blackish cupreous, the forewings purplish cupreous with a blackish stripe. The hindwings are cupreous.

References

Moths described in 1864
versicolorella